Jaga Mechhida Huduga is a 1993 Indian Kannada-language romance film, directed by H. R. Bhargava. The story is based on the novel Nishaanth, by Sai Suthe. The film stars Shiva Rajkumar, Srinath, Raagini, Lakshmi and Tiger Prabhakar. The film was widely appreciated for its songs and story upon release. Added to Shivaraj kumar successful movies and celebrated 100 days. The songs composed by Rajan–Nagendra duo were huge hits.

Cast 
 Shiva Rajkumar as Shivu
 Srinath as Mohan Rao
 Ragini as Asha
 Lakshmi as Bhavani, Rao's wife
 Tiger Prabhakar 
 Chi Guru Dutt as Srikanth, Rao's son
 K. S. Ashwath as Shivu's father
 M. P. Shankar
 Vijay Raghavendra as young Shivu
 Ramesh Bhat as Kittappa
 Pandari Bai
 M. S. Karanth
 Lalithasree

Soundtrack 
The music of the film was composed by Rajan–Nagendra.

References

External links 
 
 Songs

1993 films
1990s Kannada-language films
Indian romance films
Films scored by Rajan–Nagendra
Films based on Indian novels
1990s romance films
Films directed by H. R. Bhargava